Brown Bear, Brown Bear, What Do You See? is a children's picture book published in 1967 by Henry Holt and Company, Inc. Written and illustrated by Bill Martin Jr. and Eric Carle, the book is designed to help toddlers associate colors and meanings to objects. The book has been widely praised by parents and teachers and placed on several recognition lists. In 2010, the book was briefly banned from Texas’ third grade curriculum due to a confusion between author of children’s books Bill Martin Jr, and author of Ethical Marxism: The Categorical Imperative of Liberation (Creative Marxism) philosopher Bill Martin.

Background 
Brown Bear, Brown Bear, What Do You See?  is one of over 300 children’s books written by Bill Martin, Jr. Martin came across illustrations by Eric Carle in a newspaper, and their collaboration began shortly after. Martin and Carle write poetic books they wished they had access to as students. Their use of simplistic and rhythmic language is to help students transition from reading to writing in early stages of education. Before Martin begins writing a book, he establishes a rhythm which is then repeated throughout the book. American author and illustrator Steven Kellogg describes Martin’s purpose for writing his children's poetry books is to expose “children to the ‘music of language'." Martin believes the cheerful rhythm resonates with children, even if they do not understand the content.

Summary
The plot consists of the narrator asking various animals and people what they see. Their response is an observation of another animal or person, which again prompts the initial question, “What Do You See?” This process creates a rhythmic pattern that is consistent throughout the book. The 1984 edition begins with a Brown Bear, then features a Red Bird, a Yellow Duck, a Blue Horse, a Green Frog, a Purple Cat, a White Dog, a Black Sheep, a Goldfish, a school teacher, and lastly, children.

Publication history 
Brown Bear, Brown Bear, What Do You See? was published in 1967 by Doubleday and Company. By 2003, over 8 million hardcover copies had been sold, and the book translated into eight languages.

There are four editions of Brown Bear, Brown Bear, What Do You See? with differing endings. Carle explained that variations in text between editions (mostly on the last page) were due to Martin, and that Carle made new illustrations to go with the changes. The 1967 first edition of the book includes a monkey in place of the teacher. The 1970 edition includes a Grey Mouse and a Pink Elephant. The 1984 UK edition substitutes a monkey for the teacher.

Sequels
Carle and Martin published three spin-off books: Polar Bear, Polar Bear, What Do You Hear? (1991) (using animals from the zoo and animal sounds), Panda Bear, Panda Bear, What Do You See? (2003), (focusing on endangered species), and Baby Bear, Baby Bear, What Do You See? (2007),    (focusing on North American/forest animals).

Reception
The book was listed as one of the "Top 100 Picture Books" of all time in a 2012 poll by School Library Journal. As of 2013, it ranked 21st on a Goodreads list of "Best Children's Books." The book is praised by many parents and school teachers, many of whom requested a trade edition of the book from the publisher. The large volume of requests led to additional collaborations between Martin and Carle: two sequels: Polar Bear, Polar Bear, What Do You See? and Panda Bear, Panda Bear, What Do You See, with similar style and tone to Brown Bear, Brown Bear, What Do You See?

Texas School Board Banning 
In 2010, the Texas State Board of Education briefly removed the book from the public school curriculum after confusing the author with philosopher Bill Martin, author of Ethical Marxism: The Categorical Imperative of Liberation.

The board was discussing the Texas Essential Knowledge and Skills, which sets standards for the Texas social studies curriculum. Ethical Marxism: The Categorical Imperative of Liberation was the intended censored book in the third grade curriculum. However, the board mistook the authors because of their similar names, resulting in the banning of Brown Bear, Brown Bear, What Do You See. Texas State Board member Pat Hardy, vouched for the banning of Ethical Marxism: The Categorical Imperative of Liberation, because of its “very strong critiques of capitalism and the American System.” However, Hardy admits to doing no research herself and instead “trusting the research of another board member, Terri Leo," who had not read Ethical Marxism: The Categorical Imperative of Liberation, herself. The banned children's author never published political pieces.

The New York Times bestselling author of 22 children’s books, Michael Sampson commented that Hardy’s mistake is “a new low in terms of the group that's supposed to represent education having such faulty research and making such a false leap without substantiating what they're doing."

The banning raised concerns with the way board members approached updating the Texas Essential Knowledge and Skills. These concerns led to a re-evaluation of Texas’ Board Member’s ability to censor and update the curriculum standards.

In reflecting on this controversy, Tommy Thomason, director of the Texas Center for Community Journalism at Texas Christian University, stated that children's author Bill Martin Jr.’s only political intention is “supporting children and giving them wonderful literature they love to read."

References

1967 children's books
American picture books
Henry Holt and Company books
Books about bears
Picture books by Eric Carle